Rafael Plácido Ramos Becerril (born 5 October 1962) is a Mexican politician affiliated with the Convergencia. As of August 28, 2006 to September 1, 2009 he served as Federal Deputy of the LX Legislature of the Mexican Congress representing the 12 district of State of Mexico.

References

1962 births
Living people
Politicians from the State of Mexico
Citizens' Movement (Mexico) politicians
21st-century Mexican politicians
Deputies of the LX Legislature of Mexico
Members of the Chamber of Deputies (Mexico) for the State of Mexico